Vadim Genrikhovich Knizhnik (Russian: Вади́м Ге́нрихович Кни́жник; 20 February 1962, Kiev – 25 December 1987, Moscow) was a Soviet physicist of Jewish and Russian descent.

Biography
Knizhnik studied physics from 1978 to 1984 at the Moscow Institute for Physics and Technology. He has received his PhD at the Landau Institute for Theoretical Physics. His supervisor was Prof. A. Polyakov, however, at the time of his PhD courses ("aspirantship") Vadim was already a first-class physicist, and supervising him was a pure formality. In 1986 he became a member of the Landau Institute.  His distinguished abilities showed quite early. At the secondary school he won twice the USSR national physics olympiad. He wrote his first scientific article (in collaboration with Prof. L. Andreev) as a student in 1982. This article has dealt with kinetic properties of quantum crystals.  From 1984 he turned to quantum field theory and made very important contributions to string theory. Knizhnik died of a heart attack at the very young age of 25.

See also
 Knizhnik–Zamolodchikov equations

References

External links
 Russian Jewish Encyclopedia, retrieved November 24, 2006

1962 births
1987 deaths
Scientists from Kyiv
Ukrainian Jews
Soviet Jews
Soviet physicists
Jewish physicists
Moscow Institute of Physics and Technology alumni
Russian string theorists